Il Volo is the self-titled debut album from the pop-opera trio Il Volo, formed on the Italian singing competition Ti lascio una canzone. The album, produced by Humberto Gatica and Italian singer-producer Tony Renis, was released in Italy on November 30, 2010 and in the United States on May 17, 2011. It reached the top spot in the Austrian Albums Chart and it was certified Platinum in Italy by the Federation of the Italian Music Industry. The Spanish edition of the album received a nomination for Best Pop Album by a Duo or Group with Vocals at the 12th Latin Grammy Awards in 2011.

Reception

Chart performance
The album debuted at number 33 on the Italian Albums Chart during the week ending on December 5, 2010 and it peaked at number 6 in January 2011. Il Volo was later certified Platinum by the Federation of the Italian Music Industry for sales of 60,000 copies in Italy.

In May 2011, the International Version of the album debuted at number 10 on the US Billboard 200, selling 23,000 copies in its first week. During the same week, the album also debuted at number 1 on the US Top Classical Albums chart. In Canada, the album debuted at number 55 on the Canadian Albums Chart.

It also entered the charts in several European countries, reaching the Top 10 in the Netherlands, Germany, France and Belgium. In July 2011, the album also entered the Austrian Albums Chart at number 2, and it reached the top spot during its second week.

Track listing

Italian version

International version

Spanish version

Charts and certifications

Charts

Certifications

Year-end charts

Release history

See also
List of number-one Billboard Latin Pop Albums from the 2010s

References

2010 debut albums
Geffen Records albums
Albums produced by Humberto Gatica
Il Volo albums